"Watermelon Sugar" is a song by English singer Harry Styles from his second studio album Fine Line (2019), included as the album's second track. Styles wrote the song with Mitch Rowland and the song's producers, Tyler Johnson and Kid Harpoon. They were inspired by the American novel In Watermelon Sugar (1968) by Richard Brautigan. "Watermelon Sugar" is a horn and guitar-driven funk-pop, rock, indie pop song.

Originally released as a promotional single from Fine Line on 16 November 2019, "Watermelon Sugar" was later released as the album's fourth single on 15 May 2020. The song was generally well received by music critics. The single also performed well commercially, peaking within the top ten in more than 20 countries, including the United Kingdom, Australia, Canada, and the United States, where it became Styles' first number-one single on the Billboard Hot 100 chart. It won the 2021 Grammy Award for Best Pop Solo Performance, and also won Song of the Year at the 41st Brit Awards the same year.

The music video for "Watermelon Sugar" was released on 18 May 2020, which received many positive reviews. Directed by Bradley & Pablo and filmed in Malibu, California, it features Styles alongside a plethora of people dancing on the beach and eating watermelon. Styles has promoted the single with many live televised performances including on Saturday Night Live, Later... with Jools Holland and Today.

Background and release
"Watermelon Sugar" was written by Styles, Mitch Rowland, and producers Tyler Johnson and Kid Harpoon. It was originally written in September 2017 while Styles was on a day off from Harry Styles: Live on Tour. They went into The Cave Studio in Nashville, Tennessee and started the session by just playing around. They eventually started throwing around some ideas and came up with the repetitive chorus melody. They had the book, In Watermelon Sugar by Richard Brautigan and thought it would sound cool as the hook. The song is rumored to be about Styles' ex-girlfriend Camille Rowe, who happens to be a fan of In Watermelon Sugar.

The song was first teased by Styles in a 22 October 2019 tweet writing "Kiwi walked so Watermelon Sugar could run." Shortly after, it was revealed by iTunes to be the second track on Fine Line. "Watermelon Sugar" premiered at 23:30 ET on 16 November 2019 (4:30 UTC on 17 November) as the first promotional single from Fine Line, without any prior notice. It was accompanied by an audio video, showing the cover art for Fine Line, except with a watermelon in the hand. The song later impacted contemporary hit radio in Australia on 15 May 2020, as the album's fourth official single and was also sent to radio in Italy, Canada, and the United States. Styles promoted it with a meme generator on his website that has various lyrics from the song over a watermelon-inspired background.

Music and lyrics

"Watermelon Sugar" is a rock, funk-pop, indie pop, song with 1970s and soul elements. It is composed in  time and the key of A minor, with a tempo of 96 beats per minute and a chord progression of Dm7–Am7–C–G. The track has a structure of verse, pre-chorus, chorus, verse, pre-chorus, chorus, post-chorus, bridge, chorus, post-chorus and runs for two minutes and fifty-three seconds. Driven by guitars and horns, the song also contains brass lines, summer-inflected sonics and a simple melody, reminiscent of jazz. It opens with a strummed guitar intro where electric guitar and drum beats soon join in. Trumpets are added in the second chorus, that builds up to the bridge, featuring ecstatic horns and high notes. The song closes with a brass-led outro.

Styles' vocals, which were described as "raspy", span from D3 to A4. The song uses the metaphor of fruit and summer to describe a sexual encounter. According to Styles, the song is about the initial euphoria and excitement when one first starts seeing someone. Styles has also stated that it is about the female orgasm. He uses long notes to get this message across and the last chorus showcases Styles' higher vocal register. The song's lyrics use rhetoric and imagery. Savannah Walsh of Elle wrote about the song's meaning, asking the question "[is he] hankering for a refreshing summer treat or [is he] talking about cunnilingus," while USA Todays Patrick Ryan interpreted it as "Styles evocatively [recalling] a past fling and its sweet aftertaste."

Critical reception
"Watermelon Sugar" was generally well received by music critics. Its guitar hook was praised by Charu Sinha of Vulture. In a positive review from USA Today, Patrick Ryan called it a "intoxicating standout" on Fine Line, writing that it "[encapsulates] the sultry, funky spirit of the project." NMEs Hannah Mylrea called the song "bombastic" while the staff at DIY called it "exciting" and "sizzling." In her review for Rolling Stone, Brittany Spanos wrote "the track has the singer nostalgic for 'that summer feeling,' yearning for berries and the taste of watermelon sugar".

In his review for Variety, Chris Willman compared the song to Maroon 5 while Tim Sendra of AllMusic compared it to "Awaken, My Love!" by Childish Gambino. Writing for Now, Rea McNamara compared it to Jeanette Winterson calling it "sexual, grown-ass and tender" as well as comparing the vocal melody to "Sing It Back" by Moloko. Pastes Ellen Johnson called it Fine Lines most "traditional" song as well as comparing its bassline to Prince. Susan Hansen of Clash wrote that it has a "satisfying vibe" with its sonics. In a negative review from Consequence of Sound, Bryan Rolli called the song "plodding", while also writing it "commits the cardinal sin of being far less interesting than its title." Owen Richards of The Arts Desk also gave a negative review, calling its imagery "nonsensical," writing that it "misses the mark."

Commercial performance
In November 2019, "Watermelon Sugar" debuted at number thirty-five on the UK Singles Chart, giving Styles' his third UK top 40 single at the time. In January 2020, it reached number seventeen on the chart before departing it the following month. After its official single release in May 2020, "Watermelon Sugar" re-entered the chart at number thirty-five; later ascending to a new peak of four in August 2020, becoming the second highest-charting single from the album. As of October 2020, it has 936,260 sales and has been certified platinum by the British Phonographic Industry (BPI). In Ireland, "Watermelon Sugar" debuted at number twenty-four on the Irish Singles Chart in November 2019, before reaching number four on the chart in June 2020. In Scotland, the single re-entered the chart at number seventy-eight in May 2020 and later peaked at number two the following month. In Greece, it debuted at 36 on 15 February 2020, however on 29 June, it peaked at number 6.

After the release of Fine Line, "Watermelon Sugar" debuted at number thirty-eight on the ARIA singles chart in Australia; later reaching a new peak of twelve in its fifth week. After being released as an official single in May 2020, the track re-entered the chart; reaching a new peak of number six in June 2020, Harry's highest-charting single from the album. In New Zealand, the song debuted at number thirty-three and has so far peaked at number four. It has been certified platinum in both countries.

In the United States, "Watermelon Sugar" debuted at number sixty on the Billboard Hot 100 chart dated 30 November 2019. It peaked at number fifty-four after the release of Fine Line and officially left the chart the following month. After being released as a single, "Watermelon Sugar" re-entered the chart in May at number sixty-four and reached number one on the chart dated 15 August 2020; giving Styles' his first number-one single, his third top-ten single, as well as his fourth top-twenty single in the US, and third from Fine Line. He also became the second member of One Direction to reach number one on the Billboard Hot 100 after Zayn Malik with his 2016 hit "Pillowtalk". In doing so, Styles became first British artist to top on the Hot 100 with a single that did not top the UK Singles Chart after Adele's single "Set Fire to the Rain" in 2012 and the first British male to match the record since Jay Sean with his single "Down" in 2009. The single also topped the Mainstream Top 40 chart on the issue dated 8 August 2020, becoming the singer's second single after "Adore You" to top the chart, remaining at the summit for seven consecutive weeks. On 7 August 2020, it was certified double platinum by the Recording Industry Association of America. On the Canadian Hot 100, "Watermelon Sugar" debuted at number forty-six and later reached number three on the chart, becoming his second top-ten hit from the album in Canada.

Music video

Background and production
The song's accompanying music video premiered on YouTube at 12:00 ET (16:00 UTC) on 18 May 2020. Styles announced the video's premiere a day prior with a teaser video showing a table on a beach, which was in a scene in the music video. It was directed by Bradley & Pablo and filmed in Malibu, California on 30 January 2020. They had tried to work with Styles for other songs on Fine Line and they eventually began working on "Watermelon Sugar" a week before they began filming. The video was inspired by Paul McCartney's 1960s style and was partly filmed using a 35 and 16 mm Arri SR3 camera to make some shots look vintage.

Due to the COVID-19 pandemic, it was revealed that the video had been delayed from its original release. Bradley & Pablo were worried that Columbia Records wouldn't release the video due to it looking insensitive, so they added a message at the beginning writing "this video is dedicated to touching." Styles was praised by the models in the video for asking for consent to touch them while filming.

Synopsis

The video opens with a message on a black background writing "this video is dedicated to touching." Styles is then seen walking up to a table with a watermelon slice on a plate, where he sits down. He wears an orange crochet tank, oversized blue sunglasses, bubblegum pink nail polish and his signature "HS" rings. The table cloth on the table is the same material as a boat sail in the "Adore You" video and the sunglasses are the same ones he wore in his 2019 Rolling Stone cover. He puts the plate on the table and begins singing the opening lyrics of the song. Styles is seen running his fingers on the watermelon before taking a bite. This shot was inspired by a picture of Jack Nicholson doing the same pose.

The video then cuts to Styles being surrounded by models who feed him various fruits as well as them enjoying a picnic. The models are seen wearing 1970s floppy hats and high-waisted bikinis. Styles is seen wearing a low-cut floral Hawaiian shirt with pearls and in other shots a sweater vest with a retro collared shirt. The former outfit was inspired by a picture of Paul McCartney at a party. He is also seen lying in the sand, watching the models. Later on, they take a picture, as a group, with all of them holding a watermelon slice each. Styles wears a cropped striped sweater, a skinny fringe scarf and a pair of vintage-inspired ripped jeans, all of which come from Gucci's fall 2020 collection.

Reception
Michele Amabile Angermiller of Variety compared the video to Elton John's "I'm Still Standing" while Harper's Bazaars Chelsey Sanchez compared it to Mamma Mia!. In her review for Evening Standard, Sara Feigin noticed a similarity to Styles' previous video "Lights Up" with the models surrounding him, while The Independents Ellie Harrison thought the beach was the same beach used by Styles' former band One Direction's video "What Makes You Beautiful". Brittany Spanos of Rolling Stone and Savannah Walsh of Elle both called the video "colorful" and "beachy". Writing for Us Weekly, Nicholas Hautman called it "ultrasexy" and "retro-filtered." In her review for Entertainment Weekly, Rosy Cordero wrote "Harry Styles is wishing he was back on the beach surrounded by beautiful people, deliciously colorful fruits, and no coronavirus."

Carolyn Droke of Uproxx called the video "a celebration of summer" while Morgan Smith of People called it "dreamy." Writing for NME, Will Lavin described the video as "Styles [throwing] a beach party with a group of women, who can all be seen eating watermelon throughout." Flares Katherine Singh wrote "we'll never be able to look at a watermelon the same again" and "[the video] is pretty much poised to be the video of summer 2020." Alisha Pawa of Lifestyle Asia called the video "light-hearted" and wrote that it "evokes the nostalgia of better summer days." The music video has received over 220 million views on YouTube.
In 2021, Rolling Stone named Watermelon Sugar the 98th best music video of all time.

Live performances
Styles first performed "Watermelon Sugar" on Saturday Night Live, shortly after its release and on 21 November 2019, he performed it on Later... with Jools Holland. Both performances were performed alongside "Lights Up". He performed it at Capital FM's Jingle Bell Ball on 7 December 2019. On 13 December 2019, Styles performed the song as part of his one night only concert at The Forum in Los Angeles to celebrate the release of Fine Line. He also performed the song at a secret show at the Electric Ballroom in London on 19 December 2019. On 14 February 2020, he gave a live radio performance on BBC Radio 2's The Zoe Ball Breakfast Show and on 25 February 2020, he performed it as part of his NPR Tiny Desk Concert. It was performed by Styles on Today at Rockefeller Center on 26 February 2020. Styles performed the song on 28 February 2020 at the Music Hall of Williamsburg in Brooklyn as part of a secret session with Sirius XM and Pandora. The following day, he performed it in another secret session, this time with iHeartRadio at the Bowery Ballroom in New York City. Styles opened the 63rd Annual Grammy Awards with a jazzy rendition of "Watermelon Sugar" on 14 March 2021.

Awards and nominations

Track listing
Cassette and 7-inch vinyl
"Watermelon Sugar" – 2:53
"Watermelon Sugar" (Instrumental Version) – 2:53

Credits and personnel
Credits adapted from the liner notes of Fine Line.

Recording
 Recorded at Real World Studios (Bath, Somerset), RAK Studios (London), The Cave Studio (Nashville, Tennessee), Henson Recording Studios (Hollywood, California), and Harpoon House (Los Angeles, California)
 Mixed at EastWest Studios (Los Angeles, California)
 Mastered at Sterling Sound (Edgewater, New Jersey)

Personnel

 Harry Styles – songwriting, vocals, backing vocals
 Tyler Johnson – songwriting, production, backing vocals, keyboards
 Kid Harpoon – songwriting, production, backing vocals, acoustic guitar, electric guitar, piano
 Mitch Rowland – songwriting, drums, electric guitar, slide guitar
 Sarah Jones – backing vocals
 Pino Palladino – bass guitar
 Ivan Jackson – horn
 Dave Chegwidden – percussion
 Mark Rankin – engineering
 Nick Lobel – engineering
 Sammy Witte – engineering
 Dan Ewins – assistant engineering
 Matt Tuggle – assistant engineering
 Michael Freeman – assistant engineering
 Oli Jacobs – assistant engineering
 Oliver Middleton – assistant engineering
 Spike Stent – mixing
 Michael Freeman – mix assistant
 Randy Merrill – mastering

Charts

Weekly charts

Monthly charts

Year-end charts

Certifications

Release history

See also
List of Billboard Hot 100 number ones of 2020

Notes

References

2019 songs
2020 singles
Harry Styles songs
Songs written by Harry Styles
Songs written by Tyler Johnson (musician)
Songs written by Kid Harpoon
Song recordings produced by Kid Harpoon
Song recordings produced by Tyler Johnson (musician)
Billboard Hot 100 number-one singles
Columbia Records singles
Funk songs
Brit Award for British Single
Grammy Award for Best Pop Solo Performance
British indie pop songs
Number-one singles in Israel
Number-one singles in Portugal